Artur Costa (born 26 April 1970) is a Portuguese former swimmer. He competed at the 1988 Summer Olympics and the 1992 Summer Olympics.

References

External links
 

1970 births
Living people
Portuguese male swimmers
Olympic swimmers of Portugal
Swimmers at the 1988 Summer Olympics
Swimmers at the 1992 Summer Olympics
Swimmers from Lisbon
20th-century Portuguese people
21st-century Portuguese people